Weaverthorpe is a village and civil parish in the Ryedale district of North Yorkshire, England.

History
It was one of the leading burial sites in Yorkshire where the dead were interred in their chariots.

There was a vill on the site in the period of Viking/Norse settlement when it was known as Wifertorp (11th century). The village's name is linked to a certain Vidhfari, anglicised in Wivar. In the Domesday Book there is a mention of Wiveretorp where it was classed as very small and had depreciated in value from 1066 to 1086. Same male's name as in Wiverton (Nottingham) and in the Vierville (Wiarevilla 1158), Virville (Wivarevilla v. 1210) and Viertot of Normandy which appears to come from Old Scandinavian; which means that Weaverthorpe translates as the farm or settlement of the male name Vidhfari or Wivar.

After the Norman conquest, it was held by the Archbishop of York under Michael FitzHerbert. In the 12th century the church of St Andrew was granted to Nostell Priory until 1268. 
Lucy, daughter of Piers FitzHerbert, married Sir William de Ros of Helmsley-in-Holderness [alias Hamlake] (died ) who acquired the manor of 'Wyverthorp'. In about 1271 the manor was acquired by William de Brewes, Baron Braose of Gower, on his marriage with Mary de Ros.

From the mediaeval era until the 19th century Weaverthorpe was part of the Wapentake of Buckrose. Between 1894 and 1974 it was a part of the East Riding of Yorkshire, firstly in the Driffield Rural District, then moving to the Norton Rural District in 1935. Since 1974 it has been in  the Ryedale district of North Yorkshire.

During the Second World War, MI6 secretly installed a new type of direction finding station in a field just south of the village, it consisted of an underground metal tank with an aerial protruding above rotated by the operator inside the tank. The station was used to find the locations of German secret service radio stations and their spies in Europe.

Church of St Andrew 

The tower is reputed to be a mix of late Saxon and Norman in construction. The chancel is separated from the nave by a Norman arch. The font is probably Norman. Above the south door of the nave is a sun-dial, with a part-illegible fragment of an inscription in Saxon characters, claimed as reading: " In honore Sancti andre - Herbert W.... Hoc Monasterium ". It has been claimed as a memorial to Herbert de Winchester (died 1120/1130) who built the church. Herbert of Winchester was chamberlain to King Henry I. His son William FitzHerbert was granted by King John, the lands of "Launsborough, Collerthorpe, Wyderthorpe, Holperthorpe and the two Lottum". The unexplained reference to "ecclesiam de Clera[m]" in the charter of King Stephen relating to "Wiverthorpe", might refer to a chapel attached to a local manor house.

A Victorian benefactor of Weaverthorpe's St Andrew's church was local landowner Sir Tatton Sykes, 5th Baronet. He paid for 18 rural churches to be built, repaired or rebuilt in the East and North Yorkshire areas, but mainly in the Wolds. St Andrew's church was restored by G E Street with "lavish furnishings and decorated roofs". The Yorkshire Post described the church as boasting some impressive stained glass windows. The church was listed as Grade I in October 1966.

Geography
The village sits in the Great Wold Valley and the waters of the  winterbourne stream the Gypsey Race flow alongside the main street in the village. The waters of the Gypsey Race have carved a small valley out of the surrounding chalk. This has left small plateaus like the one that the Church of St Andrew is perched on as it overlooks the village.

There was a railway station on the York to Scarborough Line at Sherburn which was called Weaverthorpe. It had been renamed from Sherburn to Wykeham and then renamed again to Weaverthorpe. This was to avoid confusion over place names (as there was a Wykeham station on the Forge Valley Line between Pickering and Seamer).

Until 1974 the village lay in the historic county boundaries of the East Riding of Yorkshire.

References

(Note: Interesting that William FitzHerbert was granted such lands by a king whose reign did not begin until 1199; when William, archbishop and saint, had died back in 1154.)

Bibliography
Gazetteers e.g.: "Bulmer's History and Directory of East Yorkshire (1892)"

External links

Villages in North Yorkshire
Civil parishes in North Yorkshire